Illogical Life is a demo album by British singer-songwriter RJ Thompson. It was released on 10 July 2006. The demos were recorded at Trinity Heights in Newcastle upon Tyne.

Singles
Thompson released "Green Eyed" as the main single from Illogical Life, although records stretching back to 2006 regarding airplay or reception cannot be found.

Track listing

References

2006 debut albums